Wong Chun-chun (born 5 October 1972) is a Hong Kong film director, screenwriter, actress and producer. She is known for her female-centric films which include Women’s Private Parts (2000), Truth or Dare: 6th Floor Rear Flat (2003) and The Stolen Years (2013). Wong was awarded the “Hong Kong Ten Outstanding Young Persons” by the Junior Chamber International Hong Kong in 2002, and "Young Achiever of the Year" in the Women of Influence award by United States Chamber of Commerce in 2007.

Early life and education 
Born and raised in Hong Kong, Wong graduated from The Hong Kong Academy for Performing Arts in 1990. After graduation, she worked at Commercial Radio Hong Kong as a disc jockey. In 1993, Wong moved to New York to further her studies where she graduated from New York University Tisch School of the Arts. Her graduation work HUGO was selected as an NYU Best Student Film.

Career 
After graduating from New York University Tisch School of the Arts, Wong stayed in New York and produced the short film, The Hipster. In 1995, Wong established a production company in New York, Basko Wong Productions, to produce television programs for several networks such as ABC and NBC. In 1997, Wong directed her first low-budget independent feature film, A Carburetor for Suzy (1998), at her own expense. The film was screened at NewFilmmakers New York series of Anthology Film Archives in 1998.

In 1999, she returned to Hong Kong from New York and filmed Women’s Private Parts (2000), a documentary interviewing Chinese women about how they view their bodies and how they express their attitudes and thoughts towards sexuality. This film in particular peaked the interest of not only the Hong Kong film industry, but was recognized internationally and subsequently went on to win Best International Feature Film at the New York City Independent Film Festival in 2001. Following this, Wong directed Men's Private Parts (2002) as a sequel to Women’s Private Parts, which interviewed 30 men about their attitudes and thoughts towards sex, love, and power.

In 2003, Wong collaborated with Lawrence Cheng to produce the comedy, Truth or Dare: 6th Floor Rear Flat (2003), inspired by Madonna's documentary, Madonna: Truth or Dare (1991). The narrative is a story of six youths living in a 6th floor rear flat in Hong Kong. As a result, Wong was also nominated for Best New Director at the 23rd Hong Kong Film Awards.

Wong continued to shape the Hong Kong community, going on to film Six Strong Guys (2004), Protégé de la Rose Noire (2004), Wonder Women (2007), Happy Funeral (2008) and Break Up Club (2010). Of these, Wonder Women (2007) was filmed to celebrate Hong Kong's tenth anniversary of its handover, and the film was premiered at the Great Hall of the People in 2007.

Since releasing the film The Allure of Tears (2011), Wong has shifted her focus from Hong Kong to the mainland, gearing into a more commercial direction. She has since directed several romance-drama films such as The Stolen Years (2013), Girls (2014), The Secret (2016), Girls 2: Girls vs Gangsters (2018) and Don't Forget I Love You (2022).

Filmography

As filmmaker

As actress
 Mighty Baby (2002)
 Runaway Pistol (2002) - Jade
 Truth or Dare: 6th Floor Rear Flat (2003) - Amy
 Fear of Intimacy (2004)
 Six Strong Guys (2004) - Bride
 Escape from Hong Kong Island (2004) - Raymond's Sister
 All's Well, Ends Well 2009 (2004) - Servant 
 Girls (2014)

Variety, reality and cultural show
 Close To Culture (2006) - Guest host
 King Maker III (2020) - Guest judge

Awards and nominations

References

External links

 
 Wong Chun-chun at HK Cinemagic
 Wong Chun-chun at LoveHKfilm
 Interview with Wong Chun-chun

Hong Kong film directors
Hong Kong screenwriters
21st-century Hong Kong actresses
Living people
Tisch School of the Arts alumni
Hong Kong women artists
1972 births
Hong Kong film producers